Lundqvist is a Swedish surname.

Geographical distribution
As of 2014, 88.7% of all known bearers of the surname Lundqvist were residents of Sweden (frequency 1:726), 3.8% of Denmark (1:9,699), 3.5% of Finland (1:10,236) and 1.4% of Norway (1:24,030).

In Sweden, the frequency of the surname was higher than national average (1:726) in the following counties:
 Västerbotten County (1:257)
 Norrbotten County (1:350)
 Västernorrland County (1:434)
 Uppsala County (1:593)
 Gävleborg County (1:631)
 Västmanland County (1:631)
 Södermanland County (1:689)
 Östergötland County (1:693)

In Denmark, the frequency of the surname was higher than national average (1:9,699) in the following regions:
 Capital Region of Denmark (1:4,826)
 Region Zealand (1:8,154)

In Finland, the frequency of the surname was higher than national average (1:10,236) in the following regions:
 Åland (1:587)
 Ostrobothnia (1:1,910)
 Southwest Finland (1:6,333)
 Uusimaa (1:6,401)
 Lapland (1:10,193)

People
 Alex Lundqvist (born 1972), Swedish male supermodel and professional paintball player
 Anja Lundqvist (born 1971), actress
 Cecilia Lundqvist (born 1971), Swedish videoartist
 Erik Lundqvist (1908 – 1963), Swedish Olympic gold medalist in javelin throw
 Gösta Lundquist (1892 – 1944), Swedish Olympic gold medalist in sailing
 Gösta Lundqvist (geologist) (1894 – 1967), Swedish geologist father of Jan and Thomas
 Henrik Lundqvist (born 1982), Swedish ice hockey goaltender
 Jan Lundqvist (born 1926), Swedish geologist
 Joel Lundqvist (born 1982), Swedish ice hockey player
 Karin Lundqvist (born 1981), volleyballer
 Linus Lundqvist (born 1999), Swedish racing driver
 Magnus Lundqvist (1891 – 1985), Swedish cartographer and publisher
 Olov Lundqvist (born 1988), Swedish ice hockey player
 Patrik Lundqvist (born 1984), Swedish politician
 Thomas Lundqvist (geologist) (born 1932), Swedish geologist
 Thomas Lundqvist (sailor) (born 1947), Swedish Olympic sailor

See also
 Lundquist

References

Surnames
Swedish-language surnames